The Boreal Plains Ecozone, as defined by the Commission for Environmental Cooperation (CEC), is a terrestrial ecozone in the western Canadian provinces of Manitoba, Saskatchewan and Alberta. It also has minor extensions into northeastern British Columbia and south-central Northwest Territories. The region extends over 779,471 km2, of which 58,981 km2 is conserved (7.6 percent).

Wood Buffalo National Park, the largest national park in Canada, and Whooping Crane Summer Range, the only nesting and breeding area for the critically endangered whooping crane, are both located in the northern portion of this ecozone.

Industry in this ecozone once consisted primarily of forestry and agriculture, but in 1967 Great Canadian Oil Sands Limited began extracting bitumen from the Athabasca oil sands. Operations there have expanded significantly since 2003, and the oil sands are becoming an increasingly significant economic factor in the region.

Geography
Overlaying a bedrock of Cretaceous shale and Tertiary sediments are thick deposits of soil that form a flat terrain in the Interior Plains. It borders the Montane Cordillera to the west, closely following the border between Alberta and British Columbia. To its south is the Prairies ecozone for its entire extent, while to the north are the Taiga Plains, with its northeastern periphery adjacent to the Taiga Shield. 20 sub-region are located within the ecoregion.

Covering , it is a region of subdued relief with few lakes. However, meltwater from glacial retreat between 11,000 and 8,000 years ago resulted in extensive deltas and dunes, forming Lake Winnipegosis at the eastern end of this zone. It is a remnant of Lake Agassiz, a large glacial lake. Most rivers originate in the Rocky Mountains, flowing eastward through the zone.

Oil, Forestry, and agriculture are the largest industries. Agriculture takes place mainly in the Peace River Country in Alberta and British Columbia. This can employ up to 20% of the land area, though it is typically less than that. Large communities include, Fort St. John, Grande Prairie, Fort McMurray, Hayriver,  La Ronge, and The Pas.

Ecoprovinces
This ecozone can be further subdivided into three ecoprovinces:
Boreal Foothills
Central Boreal Plains
Eastern Boreal Plains

Climate
The excess moisture promotes the development of wetlands and peat bogs, which account for between 25–50% of the ecozone's area.

EcoRegions
Each province continues to work on defining subregions within the larger
national ecozone system.

The Alberta Natural Subregion – Natural Regions (2006) found within this ecozone are:
 Peace River Parkland – Parkland
 Dry Mixedwood – Boreal Forest
 Central Mixedwood – Boreal Forest
 Peace-Athabasca Delta – Boreal Forest

The Manitoba Ecoregions within this ecozone are:
 Mid-Boreal Lowland Ecoregion  
 Boreal Transition Ecoregion  
 Mid-Boreal Uplands Ecoregion 
 Interlake Plain Ecoregion

The Saskatchewan Ecoregions within this ecozone are:
 Mid-Boreal Upland
 Mid-Boreal Lowland
 Boreal Transition

Protected areas
A number of protected areas have been established to protect representative and/or significant portions of this ecozone. These include:

Alberta
 Cross Lake Provincial Park
 Dunvegan Provincial Park
 Elk Island National Park
 Lakeland Provincial Park
 Thunder Lake Provincial Park
 Wood Buffalo National Park including the Whooping Crane Summer Range

Manitoba
 Birch Island Provincial Park
 Birds Hill Provincial Park
 Brokenhead Wetland Ecological Reserve
 Clearwater Lake Provincial Park
 Chitek Lake Anishinaabe Provincial Park
 Duck Mountain Provincial Park
 Dog Lake Wildlife Management Area
 Elk Island Provincial Park
 Fisher Bay Provincial Park
 Grand Island Provincial Park
 Goose Islands Provincial Park
 Grass River Provincial Park
 Hecla-Grindstone Provincial Park
 Hilbre Wildlife Management Area
 Kinwow Bay Provincial Park
 Little Birch Wildlife Management Area
 Little Limestone Lake Provincial Park
 Long Point Ecological Reserve
 Mars Hill Wildlife Management Area
 Narcisse Wildlife Management Area
 Palsa Hazel Ecological Reserve
 Peonan Point Wildlife Management Area
 Proulx Lake Wildlife Management Area
 Red Deer Lake Wildlife Management Area
 Reindeer Island Ecological Reserve
 St. Malo Wildlife Management Area
 Ste. Anne Bog Ecological Reserve
 Sleeve Lake Wildlife Management Area
 Stuartburn Wildlife Management Area
 Rat River Wildlife Management Area
 Riding Mountain National Park
 Sturgeon Bay Provincial Park
 Walter Cook Caves Ecological Reserve
 Watson P. Davidson Wildlife Management Area

Saskatchewan
 Duck Mountain Provincial Park
 Greenwater Lake Provincial Park
 Meadow Lake Provincial Park
 Narrow Hills Provincial Park
 Prince Albert National Park

References

Ecozones of Canada
Ecozones and ecoregions of Manitoba
Ecozones and ecoregions of Saskatchewan
Ecozones and ecoregions of Alberta
Ecozones and ecoregions of British Columbia
Ecozones and ecoregions of the Northwest Territories